Dunrobin may refer to:

Australia 

 Dunrobin, Queensland, a locality in the Barcaldine Region, Queensland
 Dunrobin, Victoria

Canada 

Dunrobin, Ontario, Canada

United Kingdom 

Dunrobin Castle, Scotland
Dunrobin Castle railway station
Dunrobin (locomotive)